Jason Pawley (born 11 July 1972) is a New Zealand cricketer who played in one first-class and one List A match for Central Districts in 1994/95 and 1995/96.

See also
 List of Central Districts representative cricketers

References

External links
 

1972 births
Living people
New Zealand cricketers
Central Districts cricketers
Sportspeople from Houston